The Battle of Balantang, also known as the Second Battle of Jaro, was a battle fought in the early stages of the Philippine–American War. It was an organized counterattack by Filipino forces on U.S. forces that was executed on March 10, 1899, which resulted in the retaking the town of Jaro on the island of Panay in the Philippines. Filipino revolutionaries led by General Pascual Magbanua together with his sister Teresa Magbanua launched an attack, despite the disadvantages in training and equipment. The battle resulted in Philippine forces retaking Jaro from U.S forces. The number of Filipino casualties was not recorded. Because of her valor, Teresa Magbanua was given a prominent place in the celebration, and led her troops into the city while riding upon a white horse.

References

Balantang
History of Iloilo City
March 1899 events
1899 in the Philippines
Conflicts in 1899